Teen Witch is a 1989 American teen fantasy comedy film directed by Dorian Walker, written by Robin Menken and Vernon Zimmerman, and starring Robyn Lively and Zelda Rubinstein.

Originally pitched as a female version of Teen Wolf (1985) and later reworked into a film of its own, the film features numerous impromptu rap musical numbers and has since become a cult classic, aided by midnight theater showings and regular cable television airings (including through annual showings as part of ABC Family/Freeform's 13 Nights of Halloween). The film is also popular for its music and 1980s fashion nostalgia.

Plot
After a bike accident, the sweet-yet-nerdy 15-year-old Louise Miller knocks on the door of a strange-looking house, hoping to use the phone, a nod to The Rocky Horror Picture Show. Instead, she meets a unique but welcoming woman, the seer Madame Serena. Reading Louise's palm, Serena is stunned when she learns that Louise is a reincarnated witch and an old friend from one of her previous lives. Serena reveals that exactly one week later, on Louise's 16th birthday, her magical powers will return with the aid of a powerful amulet that was lost in a former life, an item that Madame Serena says searches for its owner.

Once Louise discovers that she has the power to alter the world around her, she attempts to make her dreams come true by casting a love spell to win over Brad, the hottest guy in school. With Madame Serena's help, Louise uses her newfound powers to become the most popular girl in school, while also getting back at her harassing English teacher, Mr. Weaver and the catty group of cheerleaders who never respected her. It is only after her popularity spell gets out of hand—which in turn causes her to abandon her equally unpopular, but loyal, best friend Polly—that Louise realizes she doesn't need magic. In the end, she relinquishes her powers by giving her amulet to Madame Serena, creating her own happy ending and winning over Brad by herself.

Cast

 Robyn Lively as Louise Miller
 Zelda Rubinstein as Madame Serena Alcott
 Dan Gauthier as Bradley "Brad" Powell
 Joshua Miller as Richie Miller
 Caren Kaye as Margaret Miller
 Dick Sargent as Frank Miller
 Lisa Fuller as Randa
 Megan A. Gallivan as Kiki
 Amanda Ingber as Polly Goldenberg-Cohen
 Noah Blake as Rhet Capiletti
 Tina Caspary as Shawn
 Shelley Berman as Mr. Weaver
 Marcia Wallace as Ms. Edith Malloy
 Cindy Valentine as Shana the Rock Star

Box office and reception
The production budget for Teen Witch was $2,500,000. The film was released in the United States on April 23, 1989 and grossed $3,875 in its opening weekend at the box office, and only $27,843 in its entire run. April 1989 box office competition included Field of Dreams starring Kevin Costner and Pet Sematary written by Stephen King. Both films were released on April 21, 1989, two days before Teen Witch was released.

Teen Witch is a cult classic, having gained newer, younger audiences after regular re-airings on premium and basic cable networks such as HBO and Cinemax in the 1990s. Jarett Wieselman of the New York Post stated, "There are good movies, there are bad movies, there are movies that are so bad they're good and then there is Teen Witch -- a cult classic that defies classification thanks to a curious combination of songs, spells and skin." Joshua John Miller stated of his involvement with the film as character Richie, "If you look at Teen Witch, it was a very campy performance. But it's a really fun film and something I have grown to honor."

There are parodies or homages of the film, especially of its rap song "Top That" (including an homage starring Alia Shawkat). Drew Grant of Nerve.com stated, "If you've never seen the original rap scene from the 80s classic Teen Witch, you must immediately stop what you're doing and watch it right now. It's everything wonderful and terrible about that decade rolled into one misguided appropriation of... hip-hop." Stephanie Marcus of The Huffington Post called "Top That" "the worst song of all time."

On July 12, 2005, MGM released the film to DVD in its original widescreen theatrical version. In 2007, ABC Family (now Freeform) acquired the basic cable television rights to the film, and has since made it a regular offering of its annual 13 Nights of Halloween holiday block.

Soundtrack 
 "All Washed Up" - Larry Weir
 "Dream Lover" - Cathy Car
 "Finest Hour" - Cindy Valentine featuring Larry Weir
 "High School Blues" - The Puppy Boys
 "I Keep on Falling" - Blue Future
 "I Like Boys" - Elizabeth and The Weirz
 "Get Up and Move" - Cathy Car
 "Much too Much" - Cathy Car
 "Never Gonna Be the Same Again" (opening sequence) - Lori Ruso
 "Never Gonna Be the Same Again" (concert version) - Cindy Valentine
 "Popular Girl" - Theresa and The Weirz
 "Rap" - Philip McKean and Larry Weir
 "Shame" - The Weirz
 "Top That" - The Michael Terry Rappers
 "In Your Arms" - Richard Elliot

Music was recorded at Weir Brothers Studio.

Accolades

|+ Eleventh Annual Youth in Film Awards 1988-1989 
|-
| 1989
| Best Young Actor Starring in a Motion Picture
| Young Artist Awards: Joshua John Miller
| 
|-
| 1989 
| Best Young Actress Starring in a Motion Picture
| Young Artist Awards: Robyn Lively
| 
|}

Adaptations

The Weir brothers created Caption Records and collaborated with Teen Witch film producer Alana Lambros for the Teen Witch the Musical project.

Financial backers of Teen Witch had neglected to provide funding for the original soundtrack release: After a decade and a half, the master audio tapes had become unavailable. The Weir brothers were interested in recreating the now-popular songs that Larry Weir had written; Alana Lambros brought her long-held view that Teen Witch the Musical was viable as a Broadway bound production to the project.

In 2007, the audio CD for Teen Witch the Musical was released, a new generation of actors were cast for the stage-play, which was presented in workshop. This adaptation never found a larger venue.

The cast of Teen Witch the Musical:

 Alycia Adler as Randa (Cheerleader)
 Bryce Blue as Rhet
 Blake McIver Ewing as Brad Powell
 Ashley Crowe as Madame Serena
 Monet Lerner as Darcy (Cheerleader)
 Tessa Ludwick as Phoebe (Cheerleader)
 Lauren Patten as Polly
 Sara Niemietz as Louise Miller
 Heather Youmans as Shana the Rock Star
 V-Style as rapper 

In April 2008, Variety reported that Ashley Tisdale signed with FremantleMedia North America and was in talks with United Artists to star in a remake of Teen Witch.

References

External links
 
 
 
 
 
 Teen Witch at TvGuide.com
 

1989 films
1989 independent films
1980s American films
1980s English-language films
1980s fantasy comedy films
1980s teen comedy films
1980s teen fantasy films
American fantasy comedy films
American independent films
American teen comedy films
Films about witchcraft